In the mathematical field of functional analysis there are several standard topologies which are given to the algebra  of bounded linear operators on a Banach space .

Introduction 

Let  be a sequence of linear operators on the Banach space .
This could have several different meanings:
 If  for all , then we say  in the strong operator topology.
In this case we say that  in the weak operator topology.

List of topologies on B(H) 

There are many topologies that can be defined on  besides the ones used above; most are at first only defined when  is a Hilbert space, even though in many cases there are appropriate generalisations. 
The topologies listed below are all locally convex, which implies that they are defined by a family of seminorms. 

In analysis, a topology is called strong if it has many open sets and weak if it has few open sets, so that the corresponding modes of convergence are, respectively, strong and weak. 
(In topology proper, these terms can suggest the opposite meaning, so strong and weak are replaced with, respectively, fine and coarse.) 
The diagram on the right is a summary of the relations, with the arrows pointing from strong to weak.

If  is a Hilbert space, the Hilbert space  has a (unique) predual ,
The seminorm  for w positive in the predual is defined to be
.

It is stronger than all the other topologies below. 
It is the weak topology on the Banach space . It is stronger than the ultraweak and weak operator topologies. (Warning: the weak Banach space topology and the weak operator topology and the ultraweak topology are all sometimes called the weak topology, but they are different.)
It is stronger than all topologies below. 
 The σ-strong-* topology or ultrastrong-* topology is the weakest topology stronger than the ultrastrong topology such that the adjoint map is continuous. It is stronger than all topologies below.
It is stronger than all the topologies below other than the strong* topology. Warning: in spite of the name "strongest topology", it is weaker than the norm topology.)
It is stronger than the weak operator topology. (Warning: the weak Banach space topology and the weak operator topology and the ultraweak topology are all sometimes called the weak topology, but they are different.)
It is stronger than the strong and weak operator topologies.
It is stronger than the weak operator topology.
(Warning: the weak Banach space topology, the weak operator topology, and the ultraweak topology are all sometimes called the weak topology, but they are different.)

Relations between the topologies 

By definition, the continuous linear functionals in the norm topology are the same as those in the weak Banach space topology. 
This dual is a rather large space with many pathological elements. 

This can be seen via, for instance, the Banach–Alaoglu theorem. 
For essentially the same reason, the ultrastrong
Same is true for the Arens-Mackey topology, the ultrastrong*, and the strong* topology.

In locally convex spaces, closure of convex sets can be characterized by the continuous linear functionals.
for all ,  has closed intersection with the closed ball of radius  in the strong*, strong, or weak (operator) topologies. 

The norm topology is metrizable and the others are not; in fact they fail to be first-countable. 
However, when  is separable, all the topologies above are metrizable when restricted to the unit ball (or to any norm-bounded subset).

Topology to use 

The most commonly used topologies are the norm, strong, and weak operator topologies. 
The weak operator topology is useful for compactness arguments, because the unit ball is compact by the Banach–Alaoglu theorem. 
The norm topology is fundamental because it makes  into a Banach space, but it is too strong for many purposes; for example,  is not separable in this topology. 
The strong operator topology could be the most commonly used.

The ultraweak and ultrastrong topologies are better-behaved than the weak and strong operator topologies, but their definitions are more complicated, so they are usually not used unless their better properties are really needed. 

The adjoint map is not continuous in the strong operator and ultrastrong topologies, while the strong* and ultrastrong* topologies are modifications so that the adjoint becomes continuous. They are not used very often.

The Arens–Mackey topology and the weak Banach space topology are relatively rarely used.

The weak and strong operator topologies are widely used as convenient approximations to the ultraweak and ultrastrong topologies. The other topologies are relatively obscure.

See also

References 

 Functional analysis, by Reed and Simon, 
 Theory of Operator Algebras I, by M. Takesaki (especially chapter II.2) 

Functional analysis
Topological vector spaces